Protalcis is a genus of moth in the family Geometridae.

References
Natural History Museum Lepidoptera genus database
 Protalcis entry at Natural History Museum

Boarmiini